The Buchanan Highway, Northern Territory, Australia, runs west from Birdum on the Stuart Highway crossing the Buntine Highway at Top Springs and eventually connecting with the Victoria Highway near Timber Creek.  it was unsealed for its entire length, at . Funding for maintenance is provided by the Northern Territory Government.

The highway was named in 1966 after Nathaniel Buchanan, a pioneering drover who first brought cattle overland from Queensland to the Northern Territory in 1877.

The highway originally ran from the Stuart Highway west to Top Springs, then Wave Hill and then to the southern end of the Duncan Road which is in Western Australia.  In 1996 the portion from Top Springs to Duncan Road was renamed the Buntine Highway, while the road from Top Springs which joins the Victoria Highway near Timber Creek was renamed as the Buchanan Highway.

Major intersections

The only major intersection on this road is with the Buntine Highway (National Route 96) at Top Springs.

Adjacent properties
It has an outstation with access to the highway.

See also

 Highways in Australia
 List of highways in the Northern Territory

References

 The Reader's Digest Great World Atlas, 1975
 Times Atlas of the World, Concise Edition, (Australia and New Zealand Edition), 8th Edition 2002. 

Highways in the Northern Territory